Katerina Marinova (born 13 July 1999 in Varna) is a Bulgarian rhythmic gymnast.

Personal life
Katerina's mother, Blagovesta, designs her leotards. Her favorite rhythmic gymnasts are fellow Bulgarians Maria Petrova, Evgenia Kanaeva, Ulyana Trofimova and Sylvia Miteva.

Career

Junior 
Marinova appeared in international competitions since 2006. In 2013, Marinova competed in the World Cup series and in the Grand Prix in Moscow, her next event in Brno she finished 4th in all-around. Marinova started the 2014 season competing in the junior division at the 2014 Moscow Grand Prix where she finished 6th in all-around, she competed at the World Cup series in Pesaro, and Minsk where she won bronze in ribbon.

On 10–16 June 2014, Marinova competed at the 2014 European Junior Championships with Team Bulgaria (together with Erika Zafirova and Boryana Kaleyn) finishing 4th, Marinova qualified 3 event finals placing 4th in hoop, clubs, and 6th in ribbon. Her next event at the Sofia World Cup, finished 5th in all around behind Linoy Ashram. Marinova went to represent Bulgaria at the 2014 Youth Olympic Games in Nanjing, China, a shaky performance left Marinova out from advancing into the Top 8 Finals who placed only 9th in qualifications.

References

External links 

 
 
 

1999 births
Living people
Bulgarian rhythmic gymnasts
Gymnasts at the 2014 Summer Youth Olympics